Basic Hanja for educational use are a subset of Hanja defined in 1972 (and subsequently revised in 2000) by the South Korean Ministry of Education for educational use. Students are expected to learn 900 characters in middle school and a further 900 at high school.

List of characters
Each hanja is sorted by the alphabetical order of the Sino-Korean reading.
The "Grades" column indicates whether the character is taught in Middle School (grades 7–9) or High School (grades 10–12).
For brevity, only one English translation is given per hanja.
The "Readings" column shows the Native Korean reading of the character first, followed by the Sino-Korean reading. Underneath the hangul forms are the Latin renditions according to the Revised Romanization, followed by a jamo-by-jamo transliteration without special provisions made for more accurate representation of phonology, but rather of spelling.
This list is currently incomplete; see the Korean-language version of this article for the complete list.

See also

Middle and high school Hanja list
Kyōiku kanji
Jōyō kanji

References

External links
 What are the basic 1,800 Chinese characters for Hanja education? — Official site of the Korea Institute for Curriculum and Evaluation (in Korean)
 Basic Chinese Characters for Hanja Education (effective from the 2014 school year).pdf — Official list of the current 1,800 Hanja characters taught in South Korean primary and secondary schools (in Korean)

Hanja
Education in Korea